Embrace is the sixth studio album by Dutch DJ and record producer Armin van Buuren. It was released on 29 October 2015 by Armada Music. The album features artists such as Angel Taylor, Cosmic Gate, Gavin DeGraw, Hardwell, Eric Vloeimans and Mr Probz.

Background
Explaining the name of the album, Van Buuren said: "The idea was to 'EMBRACE' several different instruments and sounds, and incorporate them into my sound."

Explaining the album cover, Anton Corbijn said: “I photographed Armin with the idea to modify the public perception of him and of what he is creating. He is such a nice guy, so I worked on giving him a bit more edge visually and created images that hold a mix of references to Sgt. Pepper and Mad Max. Playful stuff basically. Apt for a versatile DJ who adores music and travels the world.”

Critical reception

John Cameron from We Got This Covered felt that despite Armin van Buuren's status as a "full fledged enterprise", the album still "manages to be genuine at all the moments that count". The critic commented that "discerning trance fan[s] of yesteryear" may ridicule pop-centered tracks like "Another You", but nonetheless agreed that tracks "Make It Right" and "Gotta Be Love" still "allow the euphoric, emotional essence of trance to shine through", while calling the lack of instrumental samples heavily suggested in previous van Buuren interviews as a shortcoming of the album. Krystal Spence of Your EDM wrote that Embrace "opens cinematically like his [van Buuren] previous albums", but quickly "changes pace and sounds" throughout the album, notably with electro-trance track "Off The Hook" whose sound failed to complement with the other 14 record songs. She dubbed "Looking For Your Name" as a "beautiful ballad" produced by an electronic artist, but argued: "Unfortunately, it’s not trance. Most of Embrace isn’t."

Track listing
On 1 October 2015, the list of songs on Embrace was announced in the episode number 733 of van Buuren's radio show A State of Trance.

Notes
  signifies a vocal producer
 "Old Skool" contains elements from "Can You Feel It" by Fingers Inc.

Charts and certifications

Charts

Year-end charts

References

External links 
 Album Info on ArmadaMusic.com
 Album Released on arminvanbuuren.com

2015 albums
Armin van Buuren albums
Electronic dance music albums by Dutch artists
Armada Music albums